Kuffer or Küffer is a surname. Notable people with the surname include:

Christoph Küffer (born 1968), Swiss rower
Erwin Kuffer (born 1943), Luxembourg footballer
Michael Kuffer (born 1972), German politician

See also
Kuffner (surname)
Küfner